Lasinja is a village and a municipality in Karlovac County, Croatia. The prehistoric Lasinja culture is named after Lasinja.

History

Culture

Demographics
According to the 2011 census, the municipality of Lasinja has 1624 inhabitants, 86.58% (1 406) of whom are ethnic Croats and 11.82% (192) who are ethnic Serbs.

Settlements
Municipality includes the following settlements:

 Banski Kovačevac - 120
 Crna Draga - 136
 Desno Sredičko - 213
 Desni Štefanki - 265
 Lasinja - 573
 Novo Selo Lasinjsko - 108
 Prkos Lasinjski - 52
 Sjeničak Lasinjski - 157

Sights

Notable natives and residents

References

Municipalities of Croatia
Populated places in Karlovac County